The whole Bible in the Buryat language was completed at Selenginsk by William Swan and Edward Stallybrass, and printed in Siberia at the joint expense of the American and British and Foreign Bible Societies; but on the suppression of the mission by the Russian Government in 1840, the circulation of the book stopped.

In 1911 Larson and Almblad revised the Gospels and Acts, and in 1913 Genesis and Jonah. These were published by the British and Foreign Bible Society.

The Institute for Bible Translation is now working on a Buryat translation of the Bible, the New Testament was published in 2010.

References

Buryat language
Christianity in Russia
Buryat